Jason Goff is an anchor for NBC Sports Chicago. He is the host of Chicago Bulls Pregame/Postgame Live.

Along with his work on-air, Goff hosts the Bulls Talk Podcast, featuring interviews, news and discussions regarding the team with Insider K.C. Johnson and reporter Rob Schaefer.

Prior to joining NBC Sports Chicago, Goff worked for 670 The Score as a producer after graduating from Southern Illinois University Carbondale in 2000. In 2007, Goff was named producer of WSCR's "The Boers and Bernstein Show." In 2012, Goff left Chicago and joined WZGC 92.9 The Game in Atlanta as a "full-time evening host, along with handling pre/postgame hosting duties on the Atlanta Hawks Radio Network.". Goff also hosted a midday show on SiriusXM NBA Radio.

Goff returned to Chicago in 2014 and continued to serve as a host for SiriusXM NBA Radio and Bleacher Report on SiriusXM. In 2015, Goff returned to 670 The Score as a co-host of a midday show with Matt Spiegel, titled "The Spiegel and Goff Show." Goff later reunited with Bernstein in the afternoons for "The Bernstein and Goff Show."

Goff has also hosted for SiriusXM Big Ten Radio and ESPN Radio on “The Spain and Company Show” featuring host Sarah Spain, and the “GTL Show” featuring Goff, Taylor Twellman and Rachel Lindsay.

In March 2018, 670 The Score parted ways with Goff.

In September 2021, Goff launched a new podcast called "The Full Go" with The Ringer.

Goff is an Evanston, Illinois native and attended Evanston Township High School.

References

Year of birth missing (living people)
Living people
Place of birth missing (living people)
Southern Illinois University Carbondale alumni
People from Evanston, Illinois
Television sports anchors from Chicago
NBCUniversal people
NBC employees
American podcasters
American radio producers
American sports radio personalities
Radio personalities from Atlanta